The 1999 UCI Women's Road World Cup was the second edition of the UCI Women's Road World Cup. It consisted of nine rounds: in addition to the six rounds in 1998 that were all retained there were the New Zealand World Cup, the Primavera Rosa and La Flèche Wallonne Féminine. Australian rider Anna Wilson of Saturn Cycling Team won the series.

Races

Final classification

External links

1999 in women's road cycling
UCI Women's Road World Cup